A surrogate marriage describes the arrangement where a woman is infertile or dies young and her family substitutes another woman to bear children for the husband.

Cultural roots
Surrogate marriages exist in some African cultures, such as the Zulu culture.

The root of the arrangement is the belief that marriage is an arrangement for the continuity of life.  Where the life of the family or clan cannot be continued due to infertility or death, the family of the wife can substitute a female relative to bear children for the husband on behalf of the wife.

See also
 Levirate marriage
 Widow inheritance
 Sororate marriage
 The Handmaid's Tale

References

African culture
Types of marriage
African society